Westview, also known as the Elam Homestead and Terrell Place, is a historic plantation house and farm located in Charlotte County, Virginia; the nearest community is Brookneal, which is in Campbell County.  It was built in 1832, and is a two-story, three bay, single pile, brick dwelling in the Federal style. It has two later frame additions.  Also on the property are three contributing log slave cabins, a frame milk house, log smokehouse, log schoolhouse, log shed, two barns, a stable / hay barn, ice pit, a family cemetery, and a slave cemetery.

It was listed on the National Register of Historic Places in 2000.

References

Plantation houses in Virginia
Houses on the National Register of Historic Places in Virginia
Farms on the National Register of Historic Places in Virginia
Federal architecture in Virginia
Houses completed in 1832
Houses in Charlotte County, Virginia
National Register of Historic Places in Charlotte County, Virginia
Slave cabins and quarters in the United States